King Ndaba kaMageba was the King of the Zulu Kingdom. He was the son of King Mageba, and was king of the Zulu from 1745 to 1763.

References

Zulu kings
18th-century monarchs in Africa